Nanyuan may refer to:

 Beijing Nanyuan Airport, a closed airport in Fengtai District, Beijing
 Weifang Nanyuan Airport, in Weifang, Shandong Province
 Nanyuan station, Hangzhou

Subdistricts 
 Nanyuan Subdistrict, Beijing, in Fengtai District
 Nanyuan Subdistrict, Guangzhou, in Liwan District
 Nanyuan Subdistrict, Hangzhou, in Yuhang District
 Nanyuan Subdistrict, Jining, in Shizhong District, Jining, Shandong
 Nanyuan Subdistrict, Kaifeng, in Gulou District, Kaifeng, Henan
 Nanyuan Subdistrict, Nanjing, in Jianye District
 Nanyuan Subdistrict, Wusu, Xinjiang
 Nanyuan Subdistrict, Shenzhen